Mercédesz Vesszős (born 10 January 1992) is a Hungarian football defender currently playing in the Hungarian First Division for MTK Hungária, with whom she has also played the Champions League. She is a member of the Hungarian national team.

References

1992 births
Living people
Hungarian women's footballers
Women's association football defenders
MTK Hungária FC (women) players
Hungary women's international footballers